Dandelion Game or  Blazen tot Honderd  is a 1998 Dutch-Flemish film directed by Peter van Wijk.

Cast
Olivier Tuinier	... 	Maurits
Marie Vinck	... 	Moniek
Herbert Flack	... 	Vader
Hilde Van Mieghem	... 	Moeder
Wouter ten Pas	... 	Pompbediende
Dora van der Groen	... 	Kerkkoorleidster

External links 
 

Dutch children's films
1998 films
1990s Dutch-language films
Belgian children's films